Dennis M. Daa (born July 5, 1979) is a Filipino former professional basketball player. Daa played five seasons in the Philippine Basketball Association (PBA), and had a stint with Basilan in the Maharlika Pilipinas Basketball League (MPBL).

Daa was a member of the Meralco Bolts first PBA team in 2010. He was acquired by the Sta. Lucia Realtors in 2007 through free agency. 

In 2010, he was traded to the Barako Bull Energy Boosters in exchange for undrafted rookie Hans Thiele.

In 2011, he played for the Shopinas Clickers.

References

External links
Player Profile

1979 births
Living people
People from Tacloban
Filipino men's basketball players
Basketball players from Leyte (province)
Centers (basketball)
Power forwards (basketball)
Sta. Lucia Realtors players
Maharlika Pilipinas Basketball League players